This is a list of the 25 members of the European Parliament for Greece in the 1994 to 1999 session. See 1994 European Parliament election in Greece for the election results.

List

Greece
List
1994